The 1964 Commonwealth Prime Ministers' Conference was the 13th Meeting of the Heads of Government of the Commonwealth of Nations. It was held in the United Kingdom in July 1964, and was hosted by the UK's Prime Minister, Sir Alec Douglas-Home.

With the collapse of the Federation of Rhodesia and Nyasaland, the Commonwealth decided to exclude the white minority rule regime of Southern Rhodesia from the conference for the first time as it was not an independent state. The conference communique rejected any prospective Unilateral Declaration of Independence by the colony and called for all party talks to achieve a multi-racial state. The meeting also reaffirmed its opposition to apartheid, expressed concern about racial strife in British Guiana and the situation in Cyprus. The Commonwealth meeting expressed sympathy for Malaysia in its conflict with Indonesia. The creation of a Commonwealth Secretariat was also proposed.

Participants

References

1964
Diplomatic conferences in the United Kingdom
20th-century diplomatic conferences
1964 in international relations
1964 in London
United Kingdom and the Commonwealth of Nations
1964 conferences
July 1964 events in the United Kingdom
Alec Douglas-Home
Robert Menzies
Lester B. Pearson
Kwame Nkrumah
Jomo Kenyatta
Julius Nyerere